10.21 is the only studio album released by American metalcore group Skycamefalling, released on November 11, 2000 through Ferret Music. The album's title (pronounced "ten twenty one") is named after the date vocalist Christopher Tzompanakis had to end a relationship with a woman, October 21. A vinyl edition of the album was planned to be released sometime in April 2001, however it never surfaced.

Track listing

Personnel
Christopher Tzompanakis - vocals
Cameron Keym - guitar, piano, vocals
John Clerkin - guitar
Brian Parker - drums
Jim Winters - production

References

External links
Skycamefalling website during the release of 10.21 (Archive)

2000 albums
Skycamefalling albums